The following is a timeline of the history of the city of Brno, Moravia, Czech Republic.

Prior to 20th century

 980-1020 - Basilica of the Assumption of Our Lady founded.
 11th C. - Vratislaus II of Bohemia bestows the town on his younger brother Otto I of Olomouc.
 early 13th C. - Church of St. James established.
 mid 13th C. - Špilberk Castle established.
 1229 - Brno charter endorsed by Ottocar I of Bohemia.
 1243 - City incorporated.
 1296 - Cathedral of St. Peter and Paul established.
 1343 -  in use.
 1356 - Church of St. Thomas consecrated.
 1428 - Brno unsuccessfully besieged by Hussites.
 1451 - 27 July: Jews expelled.
 1467 - Brno besieged by forces of George of Bohemia.
 1485 - Printing press in operation.
 1645 - Brno besieged by forces of Swedish Torstensson.
 1655 - Dolní Kounice Synagogue founded.
 1742 - Brno besieged by Prussians.
 1766 - Cloth factory begins operating.
 1777 - Roman Catholic Diocese of Brno established; Mathias Franz Graf von Chorinsky Freiherr von Ledske becomes bishop.
 1780's - Joseph II, Holy Roman Emperor evicted the friars from St Thomas's Abbey.
 1782 - Brno becomes capital of Moravia-Silesia.
 1786 - Lužánky park established.
 1805 - 2 December: Battle of Austerlitz occurs near Brno; forces of Napoleon headquartered in city.
 1818 - Museum Francisceum founded.

 1822/30 - Silvio Pellico an Italian writer confined in Špilberk Castle.
 1838 - Brno main railway station opened.
 1839 - Emperor Ferdinand Northern Railway operates to Břeclav.
 1843 - Labor unrest.
 1848 - October: Labor demonstration.
 1849
 German Technical University in Brno founded.
 Population: 45,189.
 1855 - Synagogue consecrated.
 1861 - Natural History Society established.
 1864 - Vankovka engineering works built near Brno.
 1866 - 13 July: Prussians in power.
 1867
 Czech-language secondary school founded.
 Red Church construction completed.
 1869 - Population: 73,771.
 1870's - Brno Philharmonic began its existence at the Besední dům.
 1872 - Starobrno Brewery built.

 1880 -  becomes mayor.
 1881 - Organ School founded.
 1882 - Deutsches Stadttheater (Mahen Theatre) built.
 1891 -  opens.
 1894 -  becomes mayor.
 1899 - Imperial Czech Technical University of Franz Joseph founded.
 1900 - Population: 108,944.

20th century

 1910 - Population: 125,737.
 1913 - SK Židenice football club formed.
 1918
 Československá zbrojovka manufactory in business.
 Moravia becomes part of Czechoslovakia.
 Brno City Archive Library established.
 1919
 Bohunice and Slatina become part of Brno.
 Masaryk University and Brno Conservatory founded.
 1926 - 18 December: Premiere of Janáček's opera Makropulos Affair.
 1928
 Brno Exhibition Centre opens.
 Exhibition of Contemporary Culture held.
 Centrum department store built.
 1930
 Modernist Villa Tugendhat built.
 Population: 264,925.
 1935 -  in use.
 1939
 Brno (and whole country) occupied by German Nazis.
 The Germans established an internment camp for Romani people in the city. 
 1941 - First Martial Law, 239 people executed in Brno by the Germans, another 1,000 in concentration camps.
 1943 - October: The Germans established a subcamp of the Auschwitz concentration camp in the city, and brought the first transport of 251 prisoners, mostly Poles, to the subcamp. 
 1944 - Internment camp for Romani people dissolved.
 1945
 German Technical University in Brno closed.
 Subcamp of the Auschwitz concentration camp dissolved and remaining prisoners evacuated to Austria.
 Many Germans fled Brno, the rest were later expelled.
 Liberation of Brno
 Brno City Theatre established.
 1946 - Brno–Tuřany Airport opens.
 1947
 Janáček Academy of Music and Performing Arts established.
 Královo Pole indoor arena opens.
 Population: 133,637 city; 934,437 province.

 1953 - Brno Zoo and Stadion Za Lužánkami open.
 1955 - Julius Fucik Theatre active.
 1956 - Moravian Karst nature reserve established near city.
 1961
 Moravian Gallery in Brno established.
 Population: 314,235.
 1963
  begins.
  becomes mayor.
 1965 - Janáček Theatre opens.
 1974 - Population: 343,860.
 1980 -  theatre troupe active.
 1982 - Starobrno Rondo Aréna opens.
 1985 - Dukovany Nuclear Power Station commissioned near city.
 1987 - Motorsport Masaryk Circuit opens.
 1990
 Brno becomes a statutory city.
 City divided into 29 districts.
  founded.
  becomes Catholic bishop.
 1991 -  cultural space founded.
 1994 -  becomes mayor.
 1997 - M-Palace hi-rise built.
 1998 - Petr Duchoň becomes mayor.

21st century

 2001 - Cinema City Velky Spalicek opens.
 2004
 University of Defence (Czech Republic) established.
 ProtestFest begins.
  becomes mayor.
 2006 - Roman Onderka becomes mayor.
 2009 - September: Catholic pope visits Brno.
 2010 - Cinema Mundi International Film Festival begins.
 2011
 Labyrinth under Vegetable Market, Brno (historic site) opens.
 Population: 385,913.
 2012
 Spielberk Towers built.
 Brno Ossuary (historic site) opens.
 2013 - AZ Tower built.
 2014 -  becomes mayor.
 2015 - June: Anti-immigration demonstration.
 2018 - 21 March:  launched.

See also
 History of Brno
 Other names of Brno
 List of mayors of Brno
 
 List of churches of Brno
 History of Moravia
 Timelines of other cities in the Czech Republic: Prague

References

This article incorporates information from the Czech Wikipedia and German Wikipedia.

Bibliography

in English

in German
 
  1891-1897
  (includes timeline 1091-1411)

External links

 
Brno
Years in the Czech Republic
brno